Walsura pinnata is a tree in the family Meliaceae. The specific epithet  is from the Latin meaning "feather-like", referring to the leaves.

Description
The bark is smooth and pale.

Distribution and habitat
Walsura pinnata grows naturally in southern China, Indochina and Malesia. Its habitat is lowland tropical forest.

References

pinnata
Trees of China
Flora of Yunnan
Trees of Myanmar
Trees of Vietnam
Trees of Thailand
Trees of Malesia
Plants described in 1855